The 3000 metres or 3000-metre run is a track running event, also commonly known as the "3K" or "3K run", where 7.5 laps are run around an outdoor 400 m track, or 15 laps around a 200 m indoor track.

It is debated whether the 3000m should be classified as a middle-distance or long-distance event. In elite-level competition, 3000 m pace is more comparable to the pace found in the longer 5000 metres event, rather than mile pace. The world record performance for 3000 m equates to a pace of 58.76 seconds per 400 m, which is closer to the 60.43 seconds for 5000 m than the 55.46 seconds for the mile. However, the 3000 m does require some anaerobic conditioning, and an elite athlete needs to develop a high tolerance to lactic acid, as does the mile runner. Thus, the 3000 m demands a balance of aerobic endurance needed for the 5000 m and lactic acid tolerance needed for the Mile.

In men's athletics, 3000 metres has been an Olympic discipline only as a team race at the 1912, 1920 and 1924 Summer Olympics. It has not been contested at any of the IAAF outdoor championships, but is occasionally hosted at annual elite track and field meetings. It is often featured in indoor track and field programmes and is the longest-distance event present at the IAAF World Indoor Championships.

In women's athletics, 3000 metres was a standard event in the Olympic Games (1984 to 1992) and World Championships (1980 to 1993). The event was discontinued at World Championship and Olympic level after the 1993 World Championships in Athletics – Qu Yunxia being the final gold medal winner at the event. Starting with the 1995 World Championships in Athletics and the 1996 Olympic Games, it was replaced by 5000 metres, with other IAAF-organized championships following suit.

Skilled runners in this event reach speeds near vVO2max, for which the oxygen requirements of the body cannot continuously be satisfied, requiring some anaerobic effort.

All-time top 25

The men's world record is 7:20.67 set by Daniel Komen of Kenya in 1996. Komen also holds the world indoor mark with 7:24.90 minutes set in 1998. The women's world record is 8:06.11 set by Wang Junxia of China in 1993. The world indoor women's record is 8:16.60 minutes, set by Ethiopian Genzebe Dibaba in 2014.

Outdoor men
Correct as of August 2022.

Outdoor women
Correct as of May 2022.

Indoor men
Correct as of February 2023.

Notes
Below is a list of other times equal or superior to 7:32.78:
Lamecha Girma also ran 7:27.98 (2021), 7:30.54 (2022).
Berihu Aregawi also ran 7:29.24 (2021).
Selemon Barega also ran 7:30.66 (2022).
Getnet Wale also ran 7:30.88 (2022).

Indoor women
Correct as of February 2023.

Notes
Below is a list of other times equal or superior to 8:29.99:
Genzebe Dibaba also ran 8:22.50 (2016), 8:24.85 (2014), 8:26.95 (2013).
Gudaf Tsega also ran 8:22.65 (2021).
Meseret Defar also ran 8:24.46 (2010), 8:26.99 (2009), 8:27.93 (2008).
Sonia O'Sullivan also ran 8:27:57 (1995), 8:27:58 (2000), 8:28:74 (1993), 8:28:82 (1998).
Hellen Obiri also ran 8:29.46 (2017), 8:29.99 (2014).
Meselech Melkamu also ran 8:29.48 (2008).

Medalists

Women's Olympic medalists

Women's World Championships medalists

Men's World Indoor Championships medalists

Women's World Indoor Championships medalists

 Known as the World Indoor Games

Season's bests

Men (outdoor)

Men (indoor)

Women (outdoor)

Women (indoor)

External links
IAAF list of 3000-metres records in XML

Notes and references

 Statistics

 
Events in track and field
Women's athletics
Long-distance running distances
Middle-distance running
Discontinued Summer Olympic disciplines in athletics